General Morton may refer to:

Charles Gould Morton (1861–1933), U.S. Army major general
Gerald Morton (1845–1906), British Army lieutenant general
Jacob Morton (1756–1836), New York Militia major general in the War of 1812
James St. Clair Morton (1829–1864), Union Army brigadier general
Robert W. Morton (1937–2002), Royal Canadian Air Force lieutenant general